Tazehabad-e Melleh Tarshi (also Romanized as Tāzehābād-e Mellleh Tarshī) is a village in Dowlatabad Rural District, in the Central District of Ravansar County, Kermanshah Province, Iran. At the 2006 census, its population was 65, in 15 families.

References 

Populated places in Ravansar County